Daniel Fernando Pérez Reyes (born 11 August 1975) is an Argentine–born Chilean former professional footballer who played as a forward.

Club career
Born in Trelew, Chubut Province, Pérez started his career at hometown club Comisión de Actividades Infantiles in the Argentine third-tier in 1998. He played there two seasons, netting eight goals in 43 appearances.

In January 2000, Pérez successfully joined Chilean powerhouse Universidad Católica after being on trial, but he was immediately loaned to Everton from the top-tier too. In his first full professional season he performed well in Viña del Mar–based club, scoring six goals in 30 league games. Despite it, the season ended with Everton finishing bottom of the league, and being relegated to Primera B.

Once settled in Católica, he helped the team to win their eight league title, after reaching the 2002 Torneo Apertura title with Juvenal Olmos as head coach. On 5 January 2004, he refused a contract extension and then moved to Cobreloa for play the Copa Libertadores. There he helped the team to win the Torneo Apertura.

On 18 January 2006, he joined Católica's rivals Universidad de Chile. After an unsuccessful tournament, he didn't continue with The Lions for economical and sports reasons amid the club's bankruptcy. Then he signed for Palestino from Chilean first-tier too.

In December 2006, it was reported that Pérez returned to Everton — coached by his former manager Juvenal Olmos — for play the 2007 Torneo Apertura. After Olmos resignal, he wasn't considered by new coach Jorge García and was released from the club.

On 28 July 2007, he joined Argentine third-tier club Guillermo Brown. After playing 34 games and score nine goals in the 2007–08 season he retired from football.

Personal life
He naturalized Chilean by descent, due to his father is Chilean.

Honours

Club
Universidad Católica
 Primera División de Chile: 2002 Apertura

Cobreloa
 Primera División de Chile: 2004 Apertura

References

External links
 

1975 births
Living people
People from Chubut Province
Argentine footballers
Argentine sportspeople of Chilean descent
Argentine expatriate footballers
Argentine emigrants to Chile
Citizens of Chile through descent
Chilean footballers
Chile international footballers
Comisión de Actividades Infantiles footballers
Club Deportivo Universidad Católica footballers
Everton de Viña del Mar footballers
Cobreloa footballers
Universidad de Chile footballers
Club Deportivo Palestino footballers
Guillermo Brown de Puerto Madryn footballers
Deportivo Madryn players
Grupo Universitario de Tandil players
Torneo Argentino A players
Chilean Primera División players
Torneo Argentino B players
Torneo Argentino C players
Expatriate footballers in Chile
Argentine expatriate sportspeople in Chile
Association football forwards
Naturalized citizens of Chile